Grafarvogur is among the largest residential districts of Reykjavík, Iceland. It is a relatively new neighbourhood, major construction began in the late 1980s and continued well into the 1990s.

Neighbourhoods
The district includes 14 neighbourhoods: Hamrar , Foldir , Hús , Rimar , Borgir , Víkur , Engi , Spöng , Staðir , Höfðar , Bryggjuhverfi , Geirsnef , Gufunes , and Geldinganes . Of those, five (Rimar, Hamrar, Borgir, Víkur and Foldir) fall within the boundaries of historic Gufunes estate.

Shopping
Grafarvogur currently has one medium-sized shopping centre called Spöngin. It's not a mall in itself but a cluster of stores, Hagkaup being the largest. Also, there are small clusters of stores in Hverafold, by Víkurvegur and Langirimi Streets. Those are much smaller and contain only a few stores, the supermarkets being the largest of the few.

References

External links
 Official website
 Government website

Districts of Reykjavík